The Racketeer is a 1929 American Pre-Code drama film. Directed by Howard Higgin, the film is also known as Love's Conquest in the United Kingdom. It tells the tale of some members of the criminal class in 1920s America, and in particular one man and one woman's attempts to help him. Gossip columnist Hedda Hopper appears in a minor role. The film is one of the early talkies, and as a result, dialogue is very sparse.

Plot
A busker playing a violin is harassed by a group of street punks until Police Officer Mehaffy (Paul Hurst) chases them away. The intoxicated violinist passes out. When Mehaffy is about to arrest him for vagrancy the powerful Mahlon Keane (Robert Armstrong) places $50 in the violinist's pocket and has the officer place him in the next taxi where Keane will pay for a night's accommodation at the YMCA for him to sleep it off. The nearest taxi contains socialite Rhoda Philbrooke (Carole Lombard) who knows the violinist as her lover Tony Vaughan (Roland Drew); she takes him in her taxi.

Mahlon and Rhoda meet again at a fundraiser for an orphanage, with Mahlon acting as the banker at the poker table. Mahlon views Rhoda cheating at cards and covers up her indiscretion with some sleight of hand. The pair fall in love with Mahlon providing Tony's alcohol detoxification that returns him to his career as a concert violinist.

Mahlon is regarded as an important person between the forces of law and criminality. When criminal Bernie Weber (Budd Fine) disobeys Mahlon by carrying out a crime, the wheels are set in motion for a gang war.

Cast
Robert Armstrong as Mahlon Keane
Carole Lombard as Rhoda Philbrooke
Roland Drew as Tony Vaughan
Paul Hurst as Mehaffy, a Policeman
Kit Guard as Gus
Al Hill as Squid
Bobby Dunn as The Rat
Budd Fine as Bernie Weber
Hedda Hopper as Mrs. Karen Lee
Jeanette Loff as Millie Chapman
John Loder as Jack Oakhurst
Winter Hall as Mr. Sam Chapman
Winifred Harris as Mrs. Margaret Chapman
Robert Parrish as Street Urchin (uncredited)
Phillips Smalley as Roulette Player (uncredited)

Reception
The Racketeer was banned by the British Board of Film Censors in 1929, but the 61 minute film Love's Conquest was passed in 1930.

References

External links

1929 films
1929 crime drama films
American black-and-white films
American crime drama films
Films directed by Howard Higgin
Pathé Exchange films
1920s English-language films
1920s American films